Nikki Holland (born in Las Vegas, Nevada) is an American singer-songwriter, known most popularly in her band Nikki Holland & The Dirty Elizabeths (Detroit, MI). Her music is classified as Americana, ranging most popularly through the country, folk-rock and reggae influences with song such as "Stop the Rain", "Do It Back", "That Old Flame", and "Stand Strong".

Nikki Holland started performing in the Hampton Roads area of Virginia in 2005, where she recorded with her first band, 3 Kates and a Joe (including Sean Weingartner, Aaron Murphy). She then moved to New Mexico where additional recording took place, leading to a move to metro Detroit, Michigan, where she became a member of BMI and recorded and released her first album, "Hold On" (available on iTunes, Amazon, CD Baby, Spotify, and other digital music sources). Nikki has been featured on several internet radio stations, and has broken into FM radio waves recently with songs from her second CD, "Americana Made" (released in 2017). She has received accolades in the music community, and has become a trusted partner in producing music festivals in association with charitable organizations, as a headlining artist and musician's musician.

Social Activism
Holland is very active in the move for equality. Perhaps most well known for her "Until We Are Equal, Be Greater Than" (Until We Are = Be >) spoken word, this phrase and associated merchandise has flooded the globe through in person sales and small online store distribution, such as Etsy, despite the home-made outreach, the popularity of the merchandise for its saying and quality of the product has prompted many people to return time and again for merchandise that promotes taking the higher road in the face of prejudice and hatred.
Apart from her work with the push for equality, Holland spent several years as a foster parent. After fighting to adopt her teenage foster son only to see him finally returned to his birth mother after several years, she wrote "Stand Strong" for him in as a tribute in fusion with Irish, folk, pop, and hip hop. "Stand Strong" (available on YouTube) features several guest artists from longstanding Irish band Blackthorn, and rapper Siv).

References

External links
Official Website: [httsp://www.NikkiHollandMusic.com www.NikkiHollandMusic.com]
Facebook: www.Facebook.com/NikkiHollandMusic
Contribute: NikkiHolland.club

Year of birth missing (living people)
Living people
Musicians from Las Vegas
American women singer-songwriters
21st-century American women
Singer-songwriters from Nevada